Macropraonetha pterolophioides is a species of beetle in the family Cerambycidae, and the only species in the genus Macropraonetha. It was described by Gressitt in 1942.

References

Pteropliini
Beetles described in 1942